Morice v Bishop of Durham [1805] EWHC Ch J80 is an English trusts law case, concerning the policy of the beneficiary principle.

Facts
General Mordaunt Cracherode (died 20 June 1773, or in 1768 by some accounts) was appointed Lieutenant Governor of Fort St. Philip, Menorca, in 1753 and as a lieutenant-colonel was commanding officer of the marines during George Anson's voyage round the world.

His son, Clayton Mordaunt Cracherode, was an important benefactor to the British Museum. Despite leaving them his large collections of books, prints and other artworks, his home-made will left his sister Ann his land and residual fortune; she was then 79, and without children or close relations. Clayton's friend, Shute Barrington, Bishop of Durham descended upon her, and after exercising what many later felt was undue influence, persuaded her to make a new will, in which he was named sole executor, with wide power over the disposition of the funds. After bequests, some £30,000 was left for the executor to spend on "such objects of benevolence and liberality as the trustee in his own discretion shall most approve of" – perhaps equating to £2.1 million in modern terms. After Ann died in 1802 the will led to the case being litigated when her cousins Anne and William Morice sued to overturn the will. William had already been bequeathed £16,000 in the will.

The key legal point was that "The testator purported to make a trust for such objects of benevolence and liberality as the trustee in his own discretion shall most approve of."

Judgment

Court of Chancery
Sir William Grant held that the will could not amount to a charity, and so the money had to return to the next of kin.

High Court of Chancery
Lord Eldon LC, on appeal, also found that the trust could neither be valid as a private trust, because it lacked beneficiaries.

See also

English trusts law

Notes

References

Further reading
Getzler, Joshua, in Mitchell, Charles, Mitchell, Paul (eds.), Landmark Cases in Equity, pp. 157–203, 2012, Bloomsbury Publishing, 9781847319746, google books

English trusts case law
1805 in case law
Court of Chancery cases
1805 in British law